Wagstaffe is a surname. Notable people with the surname include:

Dave Wagstaffe, (1943–2013), English footballer
Sir Joseph Wagstaffe, (1611?–1666/7), Royalist officer during the English Civil War
Michael Wagstaffe, (born 1945), English cricketer

Fictional characters:
Francis Wagstaffe, Created by Toby Forward and David Johnson, published in The Spiritual Quest of Francis Wagstaffe

See also
Wagstaffe, New South Wales, Australia
Wagstaff (disambiguation)